Wellawatta is a neighbourhood of Colombo, Sri Lanka. It lies immediately south of Bambalapitiya and is classified as zone 6 within the Colombo Municipal region. The town begins at the old Dutch canal just before the Savoy Cinema and extends south to the same canal that reaches the sea just before the junction at Hospital Road  where Dehiwela begins. It is bounded on the west by the waters of the Indian Ocean and extends to Pamankada where Havelock Road forks and meets the Sri Saranankara Road bridge, which stretches over the Dutch canal, extending towards Kohuwala-Hospital Road junction on Dutugemunu Street.

The name Wellawatta means 'Sandy Garden' in Sinhalese and 'White Garden' in Tamil.

During the colonial period, much of present day Wellawatta was made of coconut estates owned by European families, particularly that of Charlemont Jonathan Gauder. Many of the roads and place names bear the names of the Gauder family including Charlemont, Frederica, Collingwood, Alexandra and Frances. The landmark Savoy cinema was built by CV De Silva in the 1940s. In the 1980s, the area drew many Tamils fleeing the civil war from the north of the country. Today, Wellawatta is a built up commercial and residential area with a small amount of light industry. Posh new apartment complexes coexist with slums particularly along the canal areas.

Schools 
Amal International School
Saiva Mangaiyar Vidyalayam
Arethusa College, Colombo 06
St. Lawrence's Convent, Colombo 06
Lumbini College (Primary section)
St. Clares

Art and Religious centers 
 Sri Dharmodaya Temple
 Sri Jayasinharamaya Temple
 Boddhirukkaramaya Temple
 Colombo Tamil Association
 Ramakrishna Mission
 Mayurapathhy Amman Kovil
 Muhiyadeen Jumu’ah Mosque
 Sri Pathrakali Amman Kovil
 Wellawatta Jumu’ah Mosque
 St. Lawrence's Church, Wellawatte

References 

Populated places in Western Province, Sri Lanka